"Refugee" is the first track released from Simple Minds founding member and vocalist Jim Kerr's first solo album Lostboy! AKA Jim Kerr in early 2010, although "Shadowland" was the first official single release from the project. According to Jim Kerr the track was written three years earlier but never had been properly arranged before producer Jez Coad started to work on the song. A short, instrumental edit of the first opening bars could be heard on the first incarnation of the Lostboy! AKA website, the same snippet was also being used by Sky Sports as the theme for their live broadcast of the Scotland football game on March 4, 2010. The album version of the track "Refugee" was exclusively premiered on Billy Sloan's radio show of the March 7, 2010, along with an exclusive remix by Simon Hayward. Both of these tracks were then added to the Lostboy! AKA  YouTube Channel. A week later (March 16t, 2010), the full album version of "Refugee" was made available as a download from the initial www.lostboyaka.com website as a "thank you" to fans. 

On April 13, 2010 "Refugee" was released as the lead track of the Welcome Gift 1 free download twin pack which was released as part of the main website launch of www.lostboyaka.com. Besides the previously released album version of "Refugee", the twin pack included the track "What Goes On" (Scary Monsters Mix), which was exclusive to this release. "What Goes On" is a cover of a Velvet Underground track, written by Lou Reed. The package also included the artwork and a text file requesting that the tracks not be uploaded to any other site.

"Refugee" was also included as the third track on the "Shadowland" promo single in its album version form, contrary to the new single mixes of the title track. The same tracks as on the "Shadoland" promo was on the download single release of "Shadowland", with the album version of "Refugee" included. 

An additional exclusive remix of the song called Atmoxic Remix was only available as a download with the album from iTunes. It was a stripped down basic version, and sounded more like the original demo than the final studio track.

Track list
Original free download from www.lostboyaka.com
"Refugee" (album mix) (4:09)

Welcome Gift 1 – free download twin pack from www.lostboyaka.com
"Refugee" (album mix) (4:09)
"What Goes On" (Scary Monsters mix) (4:45) (exclusive bonus track written by Lou Reed)

References

2010 singles
Simple Minds songs
Songs written by Jim Kerr
2010 songs
Edel AG singles